Mohamallika Pillai (born 4 November 1954), better known as Mallika Sukumaran is an Indian actress and businesswoman, known for her works in Malayalam cinema. She debuted in 1974 with the Malayalam film Utharayanam by G. Aravindan. Since then, she has appeared in over 60 films. She won the Kerala State Film Award for Second Best Actress for her role in the 1974 film Swapnadanam.

Mallika's first appearance in television was in a tele-serial by K. K. Rajeev called Peythozhiyathe. She won the Second Best Actress Award in the Kaveri Film Critics Television Awards (2004) for her role in the serial American Dreams. She is well known for her comedic roles as well as her character roles. She made her debut in Tamil cinema with the 2008 film Vaazhthugal. Mallika has also acted in some advertisements and participated in some talk shows and game shows. She runs a restaurant in Doha.

Early life and family
She was born as Mohamallika Pillai to Kainikkara Madhavan Pillai and Shobha as youngest among four children. Her father was a Gandhian and political activist, and was the younger brother of Kainikkara Padmanabha Pillai and Kainikkara Kumara Pillai. She has an elder brother, M. Velayudhan Pilla and two elder sisters, Premachandrika and Ragalathika. She had her primary education from Government Higher Secondary School for Girls, Cotton Hill. She pursued a bachelor's degree in chemistry from Government College for Women, Thiruvananthapuram.

Film career 
Mallika made her acting debut in 1974 with the Malayalam film Utharayanam directed by G. Aravindan and written by Thikkodiyan. She played the role of Radha. In the same year, she won the Kerala State Film Award for Second Best Actress for her role of Rosy Cherian in Swapnadanam. Later on, she was known for her antagonistic and comedic roles. In 1975, she acted in the film Boy Friend and later in Pichathikutappan (1979), directed by P. Venu. When she married the Malayalam actor Sukumaran, she left her acting career. She sang the song "Ormayundo" in P. P. Govindan's 1977 film Saritha, along with P. Jayachandran.

After a break, she returned to acting with the television serial Peythozhiyathe directed by K. K. Rajeev. Her future daughter-in-law Poornima Indrajith was also part of the cast, it was during its sets that her son Indrajith Sukumaran and Poornima met. Valayam, Snehadooram, Sthree Oru Santhwanam, Harichandhanam, American Dreams, Indhumukhi Chandhramathi and Porutham are some of her popular tele-serials. She also got a film-TV critics award for her role in the serial American Dreams.

Her first movie in her comeback is the Rajasenan movie Meghasandesham. Suresh Gopi was the hero of this movie. Her role in Ranjith's Ammakkilikkoodu was widely appreciated. Recently she has judged the popular reality show Amma Ammmayiyamma, telecasting on Kairali TV. She has acted in some advertisements also.

Her debut Tamil film was Vaazhthugal directed by Sebastian Seeman. In 2016, she won the lifetime achievement award, Chalachithra Prathibha Award, by the Kerala Film Critics Association Award.

Personal life

After romancing for 10 years, she married then struggling actor Jagathy Sreekumar in 1976, she eloped with him to Madras without the consent of her family. However, they got legally separated in 1979. On 17 October 1978, she married Malayalam actor Sukumaran. After marriage, she retired from acting. Her sons Prithviraj Sukumaran and Indrajith Sukumaran are leading actors in Malayalam cinema. Actress and television anchor Poornima Indrajith is her daughter in law.

In 2012, she opened a beauty and skin clinic at Doha, along with her friend. She holds a residence permit in Doha. In 2013, she launched Spice Boat, a multicuisine restaurant at West Bay, Doha. She is the CEO and the Executive Chairperson of the restaurant. By 2016, the restaurant opened six more outlets around Doha. She has a villa in Doha. In hometown, she has a house at Thiruvananthapuram where she grew up. Her sons are settled in Kochi.

Filmography

Films

1960s

1970s

1980s

2000s

2010s

2020s 

 Albums as an actress
 2020 : Ammakkorummma as Herself
 2022 : Thanal Thedi as Amma

As assistant director
 Madanolsavam
 Kanyakumari
 2 Sreekumaran Thampi's movies

As production controller
 Irakal
 Padayani

Playback singing
 Saritha (1977) - Ormayundo
 My Great Grandfather (2019) - Grandpa

As dubbing artist
  Adavukal Pahinettu (1978) for Seema
  Avalude Ravukal (1978) for Seema
 Vanisri's other language dubbing movies
 Hema Choudhary's other language dubbing movies
 Kalpana  other language dubbing movies
 Tamaar Padaar (2014) as Vanitha ; Pouran's mother  (Voice only)
 12th Man (2022) as Zakariah's mother (Voice only)
 Kaduva (2022) for Seema
 Alone (2023) as Neighbourhood aunty of Kalidas

Television

• All the programs are television serials, unless otherwise mentioned.

As guest

 On Air with Manju
 Variety Media
 Ginger Unlimited
 Mazhavil Chiri Awards 2022
 Chiriyanu Ivide Main
 Choych Choych Powam
 Cinematheque
 Rajasooyam
 Kaumudy Movies
 Nere Chovve
 Dinner Talk
 The Cue
 Jamesh Show
 Oru Happy Family
 Zee Malayalam News
 MG Coastline Garages
 Ginger Media Entertainments
 Nammal Thammil
 Swapnaveedu
 Alpam Kudumba Karyam
 Tharakudumbam
 Chathurangam
 Gandharvasandhya
 Manorama Online
 Malayali Life
 Cine Life
 Ice Break with Veena
 Manorama News
 Sunday Classics
 Hai Everybody
 Film Faktory
 Onam Ponnonam
Prime debate 
Annie's kitchen
Oru Vakku Maru Vakku
Dream Drive
Marikkatha Pranayam
Tharapakittu
Annorikkal
Chakkarappanthal
Katha Ithuvare
First Print
Namasthe Keralam
Innalakaliloode Yo Yo Krishnanum Yasodamaarum

References

External links 

Actresses from Kerala
Living people
People from Alappuzha district
Actresses in Malayalam cinema
Indian film actresses
Kerala State Film Award winners
20th-century Indian actresses
21st-century Indian actresses
Indian television actresses
Actresses in Malayalam television
Actresses in Tamil cinema
Indian voice actresses
Indian Hindus
1954 births